Charles is a neighborhood in northern Providence, Rhode Island.  Along with Wanskuck, it comprises what is sometimes referred to as the North End. To the west Charles is partitioned from Wanskuck by Route 146, while the Chad Brown public housing complex separates Charles from Smith Hill to the south, and the West River and Interstate 95 bounds the area to the east.  The city limits abutting the city of North Providence bound Charles to the north.

History
Until Wanskuck Road (now Branch Avenue) was completed in 1706, Charles's lack of connections to the more developed part of Providence kept the area sparsely populated.  In 1765, the isolated North End  (of which Charles is a part) was annexed to the neighboring town of North Providence.  By the 19th century, the improvement in infrastructure and proximity to the West River caused corporations such as the Silver Spring Bleaching and Dyeing Company to move to the area.  With the new industry came an influx of immigrants and an increase in demand for housing stock.  By the end of the century the neighborhood was filled with one and two family homes of Irish, English, German, Scottish, and Italian immigrant families, with the largest presence found of the latter.  This rapid growth and development were among the factors that lead North Providence to return the North End to Providence in 1874.

The neighborhood's connection to the rest of Providence improved further with streetcar service in 1895.  By the 1930s, Charles was densely settled by the working and middle class.

In the latter half of the 20th century, much industry declined and withdrew from the region, though the effects have been somewhat mitigated by Providence's attempts to market part of the area as an industrial park.

Demographics
For the most part, Charles remains a primarily residential and commercial neighborhood.  Homeownership, unemployment, and income levels remain steady and the neighborhood remains predominantly white with 52.7% of occupants claiming Italian ancestry. 16% of residents are Hispanic and 8% are African-American. One in three children under the age of six speaks a language other than English as their primary language.

The median family income is $36,966, above the citywide average of $32,058. 16% of households live in poverty and 7% of households receive some form of public assistance.

Government
All of Charles is in Ward 4, which is represented in the Providence City Council by Nicholas J. Narducci, Jr, a Democrat.

Parks
The Charles neighborhood includes four green spaces:

Ascham Field - a  athletic filed.
Hopkins Square - a  plaza at the corner of Branch Avenue and Charles Street. The square includes a statue of Esek Hopkins.
Prete-Metcalf Field - an  area of athletic fields and walking trails
St Ann's Plaza - a small plaza at the corner of Branch Avenue and Hawkins Street.

There is also a preserve, the Canada Pond Management area, in the northwest corner of Charles. The preserve extends into North Providence, Rhode Island.

References

Provplan.org Neighborhood Profiles
Neighborhood Profiles at providenceri.com
Alternative Neighborhood Names from Neighborhood Profiles at providenceri.com

Neighborhoods in Providence, Rhode Island
Italian-American culture in Providence, Rhode Island